Myanmar Airways International Co., Ltd. is a privately owned airline headquartered in Yangon, Myanmar. It operates scheduled international services to destinations mainly in Southeast Asia and is based at Yangon International Airport. Myanmar Airways International was the sponsor of the 2013 Southeast Asian Games. MAI's logo shows pyinsarupa, a traditional Burmese chimeric animal.

History

Early years

The airline was founded in 1946.

Myanmar Airways International (MAI) took off in August 1993, initially created as a joint venture between Myanma Airways and Singapore-based Highsonic Enterprises, with the support of Royal Brunei Airlines. It boasted a Singapore management team (many ex-Singapore Airlines staff), new Boeing aircraft, all-expatriate cockpit crews, improved training for flight attendants and new UK Civil Aviation Authority operating standards. Eventually, the original joint venture was terminated and MAI became a wholly owned Myanmar company. In January 2001, a new joint venture was formed in which Region Air Myanmar (HK) Ltd., took a 49% stake and a local businessman through his company pyae

Co. took an 11% share and Myanma Airways retained 40%. 

In 2001, a new corporate identity and aircraft livery were rolled out and the company completed its first major cabin-crew-upgrading program. In 2002, the airline obtained new International Air Transport Association (IATA) airline designator codes and joined both the IATA Multilateral Interline Traffic Agreement (MITA) and IATA Clearing House. The airline sent 122 employees on training courses at Malaysia Airlines and Royal Brunei Airlines training centers. In 2003, MAI launched a code-share agreement with Thai Airways International on the Bangkok-Yangon-Bangkok route. The company also has code-sharing with Malaysia Airlines, Qatar Airways and Jetstar Asia Airways. In 2004, the airline took delivery of new uniforms for ground staff and recruited a further 16 new cabin-crew trainees.

In February 2007, the foreign management team under Region Air Myanmar (HK) Ltd. transferred its control to MAI.

Expansion and modernization since 2009
MAI inherited a long history of government ownership when it was separated from Myanmar National Airlines in 1993. The new airline was initially formed as a joint venture company between Myanma Airways and a Singapore investment company. Just prior to the 2010 General Election, Myanmar's government sold an 80% stake in MAI to one of the country's largest financial institutions, Kanbawza Bank Ltd, retaining a 20% stake through the state-owned domestic carrier, Myanma Airways. In 2009 MAI received delivery of its first two aircraft with the remainder of the carrier's short-haul fleet being leased from neighboring countries.  Operations radically change from 2010 under KBZ Bank's ownership with organizational and route adjustments. As well as fully commercializing the airline's operations, the carrier's controlling parent also launched a domestic partner airline, Air KBZ in June 2010.  Since then, MAI has been expanding its fleet and currently has a total of five Airbus A320s and two Airbus A319s in its service. It also leased Airbus A321s from Air Méditerranée in the winter of 2010-2011 and deployed them on Bangkok-Singapore services. Non-hub routes between Bangkok-Singapore and Siem Reap-Phnom Penh were successfully inaugurated in 2010 and 2011 respectively. In 2013, MAI received IOSA certificate, the only recipient in Myanmar of the IATA Operational Safety Audit Program (IOSA) Operator. In 2016, Kanbawza (KBZ) Group acquired full control of MAI. In 2018 the airline commenced services between Mandalay-Bangkok.

Services

Sky Smile Privilege Program
In this frequent-flyer program, MAI offers three levels of membership - Jade, Ruby and Diamond. Passengers who have traveled on three return flights within one calendar year are entitled to apply for the Ruby membership and start earning points required to qualify for the next level. If a passenger has completed a minimum of six return flights with his Ruby membership, the membership will automatically be moved up to the Diamond membership scheme. A Sky Smile Privilege Program member can redeem the mile points earned by flying with MAI for free travel tickets.

Sky Smile Executive Lounge
MAI Sky Smile Executive Lounge at Yangon International Airport is offered exclusively for Diamond Card Members and business class passengers. The lounge offers refreshments, entertainment and business secretary services.

Destinations
Myanmar Airways International serves the following destinations:

Codeshare agreements
Myanmar Airways International has codeshare agreements with the following airlines:
 Air KBZ
 All Nippon Airways
 Asiana Airlines
 Garuda Indonesia
 Korean Air
 Malaysia Airlines
 Royal Brunei Airlines
 SriLankan Airlines
 Thai Airways International

Fleet

Current fleet
The Myanmar Airways International fleet comprises the following aircraft:

Former fleet
MAI has operated a variety of aircraft types, including:

See also
 List of airlines of Myanmar

References

External links

 Official website

Airlines of Myanmar
Airlines established in 1946
Government-owned airlines
Companies based in Yangon